Ontario Car Company was a freight car, passenger car, and horsecar manufacturer based in London, Ontario from 1872 to 1886.

The company was sometimes referenced as T. Muir after company manager Thomas Muir and London Car Works.

The facility was located on east side of Rectory Street north of Cabell Street.

Products

Ontario Car made wooden freight and passenger cars for various railways in Ontario and Quebec:

 Great Western Railway
 Grand Trunk Railway
 Canada Southern Railway
 Intercolonial Railway
 St. Lawrence & Ottawa, Midland Railway
 Quebec, Montreal, Ottawa and Occidental Railway
 New Brunswick Railway
 Quebec Central Railway
 Canadian Pacific Railway

A small number of horsecars were made for smaller streetcar operators:

 London Street Railway

Ontario Car last made cars in 1886 and disappeared by 1890.

References

Defunct rolling stock manufacturers of Canada
1872 establishments
1886 disestablishments